The Air Force Security Assistance and Cooperation (AFSAC) Directorate at Wright-Patterson Air Force Base, Ohio, develops and executes international agreements with friendly forces to provide defense materiel and services, in support of US national security.  It has been a staff agency of the Air Force Life Cycle Management Center of the Air Force Materiel Command since 1 October 2012 when it replaced the Air Force Security Assistance Center.  The office symbol of the Directorate is AFLCMC/WF.

From 1992–2012, the unit was known as the Air Force Security Assistance Center.  Prior to that, AFSAC was designated the International Logistics Center (ILC) (1978–1992) and the International Logistics Directorate, Air Force Acquisition Logistics Division (1976–1978).

Staff agencies
WFA – Regional Support Division
WFE – Foreign Military Sales Construction Division
WFF – Financial Management Division
WFK – Contract Execution Division
WFI – International Division
WFM – Central Division
WFN – International Affairs Policy and Programs Division
WFO – Operations Management Division
WFR – Communications and Information Division

Predecessor
 Constituted as the AFLC International Logistics Center on 12 April 1978
 Activated on 1 May 1978
 Redesignated Air Force Security Assistance Center on 1 July 1992
 Inactivated on 1 October 2012

 Assigned to 
 Air Force Logistics Command, 1 May 1978
 Air Force Materiel Command, 1 July 1992 – 1 October 2012 (attached to Air Force Life Cycle Management Center after 9 July 2012)

 Stationed at Wright-Patterson Air Force Base, Ohio, 1 May 1978 – 1 October 2012

See also

References

External links
Air Force Security Assistance and Cooperation Directorate Online
 WWW.AF.MIL News Story – "Wolfenbarger:  AFMC 5-Center Reorganization on Track"
Air Force Security Assistance and Cooperation Directorate (AFSAC) Public Affairs Website

Centers of the United States Air Force
Military in Ohio